Sir Nripendra Nath Sircar, KCSI (died August 1945) was an Indian lawyer and political figure. He was Advocate-General of Bengal from 1928 to 1934 and Law Member of the Council of the Governor-General of India from 1934 to 1939.

He was the grandson of educationist Peary Charan Sarkar and the father of filmmaker Birendranath Sircar.

References 

 

Knights Bachelor
Members of the Council of the Governor General of India
Knights Commander of the Order of the Star of India
Indian knights
Presidency University, Kolkata alumni
Members of Lincoln's Inn
20th-century Indian lawyers
Advocates General for Indian states
Bengali lawyers
Members of the Central Legislative Assembly of India
Brahmos